William John "Digger" Dawson (1905 – ?) was an English professional footballer who played as a full back in the Football League for Carlisle United, Crewe Alexandra and York City and in non-League football for Newbiggin West End and Workington.

References

1905 births
Sportspeople from Castleford
Year of death missing
English footballers
Association football fullbacks
Carlisle United F.C. players
Crewe Alexandra F.C. players
York City F.C. players
Workington A.F.C. players
English Football League players
People from Newbiggin-by-the-Sea
Footballers from Northumberland